Societatea Sportivă Universitară Politehnica Timișoara, commonly known as SSU Politehnica Timișoara, Politehnica Timișoara, or simply Poli Timișoara, is a Romanian professional football club based in Timișoara, Timiș County, which competes in the Liga II.

Originally named ASU Politehnica, the team was formed following the dissolution of the original FC Politehnica Timișoara in 2012. During that year, ACS Recaș was moved to the city and renamed ACS Poli Timișoara, eventually reaching the top flight while ASU struggled in the lower leagues. Between the two, the majority of the fans chose to support the latter, and in 2021 ACS Poli was also dissolved. That summer, the Polytechnic University of Timișoara, founder of the original team in 1921, ceased the FC Politehnica brand and records to SSU.

Hence, SSU Politehnica Timișoara is the only active entity asserting the history of the original club, which has totalled 44 seasons in the top national league and won two Cupa României trophies, in 1957–58 and 1979–80. The team plays its home matches in white and purple shirts at the Dan Păltinișanu Stadium, which has a capacity of 32,972 seats. Their bitter rivals are UTA Arad, with whom they contest the West derby.

History

Beginnings and lower leagues (1921–1945)
The club was founded in 1921 by the Polytechnic University of Timișoara under the name Societatea Sportiva Politehnica.

Its initial aim was to provide an opportunity for university students to work on their fitness within a competitive environment. The logistics of the sport proved problematic, as there were limited financial means available. Thanks to contributions gathered from university professors and employees, the club bought their first football kits, with white-black vertical stripes, and rented the "Patria" football stadium. It was not until 1928 that the club developed its own training grounds, "Politehnica", which were built by volunteers. Players for the team were chosen on merit from the pool of Timișoara students and high-schoolers, who trained after school hours during the week and played football on weekends. The football landscape in the city was already developed at that time, with CAT, RGMT and Chinezul dominating locally.

After spending three years in the District Championships II, Politehnica won promotion to the first tier in 1924, by defeating Kadima Timișoara. The club became established in the years to come, even finishing 2nd in the 1926–27 District Championships I, when Politehnica lost out to Chinezul by a single point, who were one of Romania's most famous football names at the time. However, the competitive level could not be easily sustained by a university club, as it was subject to the inflow and outflow of players conditioned by their student status. After a decline towards the end of the decade, the low-point came at the beginning of the 1930s, between 1931 and 1933, when due to insufficient material resources, Politehnica had to suspend its football activities. It reappeared in 1934 but remained a modest club, with mid-table classifications in the District Championships I, as well as the Divizia C and Divizia B, once they were founded. As war beckoned, the national championships were suspended and all football activities reduced to friendly matches and the "Cupa Eroilor" (1943–44).

Until the second World War, Politehnica was far from the number one Timișoara football club. Chinezul and then Ripensia won multiple Romanian championship, whereas the students' club failed to achieve similar results. It did, however, propel several players to the Romania national football team, with the likes of Sfera, Ignuţa, Deheleanu, Chiroiu, Pop, Protopopescu and Sepi all wearing the national jerseys.

Becoming one of the city's notable clubs (1945–1991)

With Romania under a communist regime, these decades were a challenge for Politehnica, as the club represented an educational institution of the highest tier. The numerous promotions and relegations between the first two national leagues were contrasted by the two Romanian cups won and the club's first forays into international football.

Politehnica was first promoted to Romanian top league, the Divizia A, in 1948, and played under the name CSU Timișoara in the first season. Shortly thereafter (from 1950), the club was renamed Știința Timișoara, in line with the desired nomenclature of the times. In spite of suffering its first relegation in 1951, the decade was an unusually consistent one, with the club returning swiftly to the top division and staying there until the season 1959. The high-point of the Ştiinţa years was winning the 1957–58 Romanian Cup, a 1–0 victory against Progresul București, with the club finishing joint first in the league in the same season, but losing out on goal difference.

The next decade saw the club struggle to remain in the first league, particularly towards the end of the 60s. However, it was then that the club's modern identity started taking shape. Firstly, in 1963, the largest stadium in Timişoara was completed. It was initially named "1 Mai", honoring the socialist workers' day, before being renamed several times in the 90s and finally settling on Stadionul Dan Păltinişanu. Secondly, the club reverted to its previous name of Politehnica Timișoara in 1966 and went to play during the next five decades on the then-erected stadium.

When Politehnica returned to the first league in 1973, after struggling to win promotion for several years, it went on to celebrate one of its best streaks in the top flight. With the likes of Emeric Dembrovschi and Dan Păltinişanu in the team, who both played for Romania and went on to become some of the most capped players in the club's history, and under the management of prof. Ion V. Ionescu, Politehnica lost that season's cup final. After managing a third place in the league with manager Angelo Niculescu in 1978, Politehnica took part in a continental competition for the first time. It was the 1978–79 UEFA Cup, where Poli defeated MTK Budapest (2–0 and 1–2), before going down to Honved Budapest (2–0 and 0–4) in the second round.

The club remained steady and managed to win its second cup trophy the following season, by beating Steaua București with 2–1, after extra time. Politehnica thereby qualified for the UEFA Cup Winners' Cup, where it managed to eliminate Celtic Glasgow (1–0 and 1–2), before being defeated by West Ham United (1–0 and 0–4) in second leg. In spite of losing another Romanian Cup final in 1981, the club qualified once more for the UEFA Cup Winners' Cup, where they lost to Leipzig 2–5 on aggregate.

After being relegated in 1983, Politehnica yo-yo-ed between Divizia A and the Divizia B, with promotions in 1984, 1987, 1989 and relegations in 1986 and 1988. Fans ironically called this period as the 'ABBA years'. As the Romanian Revolution, which started in Timișoara, signalled the end of an era, Politehnica managed to grab its most impressive result yet in European competitions, by eliminating Atlético Madrid (2–0 and 0–1) in the 1990–91 UEFA Cup.

After privatisation (1991–2001)
By state order, all public institutions were forced to relinquish and reorganize any owned sports clubs in 1991, to effectively privatize them. As a result, alongside the newly organized football club appeared a non-profit association, AFC Politehnica Timișoara. The latter, consisting of previous club players and staff, was mandated with owning and protecting the club records and intellectual property.

The club's swan song near the top of Romanian football for the next decade was to be the 1991–92 season. Poli finished 5th and also reached the Romanian Cup final, only to lose it on penalties against Steaua București. The consequent participation in the 1992–93 UEFA Cup, saw the club draw against Real Madrid (1–1 in Timișoara), before being defeated in the return leg (0–4). Politehnica lost several key players in the years after the forced privatization, which slowly lead to the team's downfall. In fewer than twenty four months from their draw against Real, the club was relegated to the Divizia B in 1994. Despite a fast return to the first league in 1995, Poli failed to consolidate their position and were soon relegated once more after the 1996–97 season.

An inability to rebound lead to mounting financial pressures. The club was temporarily owned by a Timișoara based businessman between 1998 and 2000, before the local authorities accepted the bid of an Italian investor, Claudio Zambon, to take over Politehnica. Despite an initial financial outlay, Poli finished 15th and was relegated to the third league, Divizia C, where it had last played in 1938. To avoid such an outcome, Zambon and the local authorities struck a deal with a league two club, Dacia Pitești, and purchased their license to participate in the Divizia B. After failing to earn promotion to top flight, the 2001–02 season posed an insurmountable challenge for Politehnica. Zambon's departure following disagreements with the local authorities meant the club found itself in dire financial straits. Forced to use mostly youth players, Politehnica finished the season dead last, with one win and four draws to its name, but negative eight points in the standings, due to unpaid debts. Once again the club was bound to be relegated to the third division.

Identity crisis, glory years and downfall (2002–2012)

In 2002, AEK Bucharest were promoted to Liga I, Romanian football's top division, for the first time, whereupon Anton Doboș, the club's owner, moved it to Timișoara. It was renamed Politehnica AEK Timișoara after merging with CSU Politehnica, a club owned and run by the Politehnica University, and received the full support of local authorities and white-purple fans. After a rocky first season, which required a spectacular relegation play-off against Gloria Buzău to avoid demotion, Poli AEK consolidated during the next season, finishing on a safe mid-table position. Moreover, starting with the 2004–05 season, the team changed its name to FCU Politehnica Timișoara, trying to reestablish its former identity.

Financially difficulties looming, Politehnica changed ownership once more. Former president Anton Doboș stayed on at the club for another year in a new position, while Balkan Petroleum Ltd., owned by Marian Iancu, took full charge. Significant investments in the transfer market transformed the club overnight, as it received the nickname "EuroPoli" for its newly found ambitions to reach the top of Romanian football.

During the takeover by Marian Iancu, a dispute regarding the proprietary rights for the club name, colors and records arose. After prolonged litigation, Politehnica was forced to change its name to FC Timișoara, following a decision by the Court of Arbitration for Sport. It was deemed that the colors and records dating before 2002 were lost in favor of former Politehnica Timișoara owner, Claudio Zambon. The Italian had struck a deal with AFC Politehnica, the non-profit association which owned said proprietary items, when he left Timișoara during the 2001–02 season.

Results on the pitch improved immediately after the takeover, but a leap to the Liga 1 podium proved elusive until 2008–09, when Politehnica finished runner-up, a feat repeated two seasons later. The club did, however, rejoin European football the season before that by qualifying for the UEFA Cup – sixteen years after its last appearance against Atletico Madrid. More European appearances followed, culminating with the qualification for the 3rd preliminary round of the 2009–10 UEFA Champions League. The team defeated the reigning UEFA Cup champions Shakhtar Donetsk, but were eliminated from the competition during the playoff round, which still meant the club would take part in the 2009–10 UEFA Europa League group stage.

In November 2010, the Romanian Court of Appeal returned Politehnica's name, colors and records to FC Timișoara.

Despite finishing second in the 2010–11 Liga I, the team was relegated to Liga II after the club failed to meet the requirements for obtaining the necessary licence to play in the first division. They played in the 2011–12 Liga II under the name of Politehnica Timișoara, and gained promotion back to the Liga I but were again denied the licence and were dissolved in September 2012. ACS Recaș was moved to Timișoara and was renamed ACS Poli Timișoara but the fans decided to support the amateur team ASU Politehnica Timișoara, considering ACS Poli Timișoara is a fraud and a political maneuver.

The Romanian Football Federation announced before the start of the 2021–22 Liga II championship, that the Polytechnic University of Timișoara, the owner of the logo, history and all of Politehnica Timișoara's football records, approves the use of these by SSU Politehnica Timișoara. So from a legal point of view, from now on, this team will be considered as the official and legal successor of the old FC Politehnica Timișoara team.

Founding as ASU Politehnica (2012)
Lacking other ambitions, in most of its business the team has evolved in the municipal championship. Following the dissolution of the Liga II team and disagreeing with the mayor's proposal to move ACS Recaș to Timișoara, South Lawn representatives, together with other fans of Politehnica Timișoara, decided to support the Liga V team, ASU Politehnica, which is the only now that they can identify as belonging to the right of the Polytechnic Institute, institution which appeared in 1921 as Politehnica Timișoara. Even if ASU Politehnica is not the legal successor of the former Divizia A and B team and even if not holding Polytechnics old track record, this is the only team that Poli supporters recognize as the one that can carry forward the spirit of the white and purple colours of Timișoara.

County Leagues (2012–2015)
On their first season after founding they reached the second place in 2012–2013 Liga V season and promoted to the next league, Liga IV Timiș County. They reached again the second place but this time they not promoted to Liga III, anyway they won their first trophy Cupa României, Timiș County round, beating FC Giarmata in the final. Next year they won the championship and qualified to the 2014–15 Liga IV promotion play-offs. In the same year they won a new established trophy named Football without owners, a friendly tournament of four teams without owners from Romania. The other teams were fan-owned phoenix clubs like ASU Poli named Argeș 1953 Pitești, FC Vaslui 2002 and the host LSS Voința Sibiu. On 11 June, was announced that the team will play against Voința Lupac, the champions of Liga IV Caraș-Severin County, in the play-off promotion match for a place in the 2015–16 Liga III season. In the home match they beat them (5–1) and secured the promotion. Away they lost (1–2) but they still promoted to Liga III, for the first time in their short history.

Professional Leagues (2015–present)
ASU Poli debuted very good in the 2015–16 Liga III with a victory against Minerul Motru (3–0), then they had their first victory away against Millenium Giarmata (3–1), and in the third round they defeated the last year series runners-up Metalurgistul Cugir (2–0). At the end of the season ASU Poli won their series and promoted again, this time in Liga II, after a close fight with Performanța Ighiu and Metalurgistul Cugir. During the 2016–17 Cupa României, they had their first televised cup match, a 3–0 defeat against Pandurii Târgu Jiu in the round of 32, this was also the best result in the cup after they defeated Șoimii Pâncota in the fourth round.

In the summer of 2021, ASU Politehnica Timișoara was renamed as SSU Politehnica Timișoara. The Romanian Football Federation announced before the start of the 2021–22 Liga II championship that the Polytechnic University of Timișoara, the owner of the logo, history and all of Politehnica Timișoara's football records, approves the use of these by SSU Politehnica Timișoara. So from a legal point of view, from now on, this team will be considered as the official and legal successor of the old FC Politehnica Timișoara team.

Supporters and Rivalries

Historically, Poli has been the most prominent football club in Timișoara after 1945, playing consistently in either the first or the second tier of Romanian football. Local rivalries with CFR Timișoara and UM Timișoara were relevant until the early 2000s. Afterwards, the former was relegated to a semi-professional status in the lower leagues and the latter was dissolved in 2008. A more recent local rivalry has emerged since the 2010s, with Ripensia Timișoara. SSU Poli has many fans in Romania but also in other countries. The roots of the Poli ultras movement was found in 1995 when groups like Urban Guerilla, Gruppo Soarelui, Frenetic, Banatica, Drojdierii or Gruppo Autonomo Viola appear in the South End.

Over the years, Poli developed rivalries with UTA Arad and Dinamo București. The rivalry with UTA, also known as West Derby, stems from the natural competition between the cities of Timișoara and Arad, which are located close to each other and are the main cities in the region. Both Timișoara and Arad claim to be the first place where football was played in Romania, with Timișoara being the true first city in Romania to host a football game.

Other rivalries are shared with CFR Cluj, Bihor Oradea, Steaua București and Universitatea Craiova. 

Over the years, Politehnica Timișoara fans have established close friendships with the supporters of Rapid București and the Nordkurve from Borussia Mönchengladbach.

Honours

Domestic

Leagues
Liga I
Runners-up (2): 2008–09, 2010–11
Liga II
Winners (10): 1947–48, 1952, 1959–60, 1964–65, 1972–73, 1983–84, 1986–87, 1988–89, 1994–95, 2011–12 (record)
Runners-up (1): 1970–71
Liga III
Winners (1): 2015–16
Liga IV – Timiș County
Winners (1): 2014–15
Runners-up (1): 2013–14
Liga V – Timiș County
Runners-up (1): 2012–13

Cups
Romanian Cup
Winners (2): 1957–58, 1979–80
Runners-up (6): 1973–74, 1980–81, 1982–83, 1991–92, 2006–07, 2008–09
Winners of Timiș County Round (1): 2013–14

Friendly
Football without Owners Tournament
Winners (1): 2015
Dinu Instal Winter Cup
Winners (1): 2014

Players

First-team squad

Out on loan

Most capped players

Club Officials

Board of directors

Current technical staff

League history

See also
 List of fan-owned sports teams
 ASU Politehnica Timișoara (women)

References

External links
Official website 

Football clubs in Timiș County
University and college association football clubs in Romania
Politehnica University of Timișoara
Fan-owned football clubs
Sport in Timișoara
Association football clubs established in 1921
Liga II clubs
Liga III clubs
Liga IV clubs
2012 establishments in Romania